Epidesmia chilonaria is a species of moth of the family Geometridae. It is found in the south-eastern quarter of Australia.

The larvae feed on Eucalyptus and Callistemon species.

References

Oenochrominae
Moths of Australia
Moths described in 1855
Taxa named by Gottlieb August Wilhelm Herrich-Schäffer